Public School 15 is a historic school in Eastchester in the Bronx, New York City. It was built in 1877 in the Victorian Gothic style.  It is an H-shaped red brick building on a stone foundation. It features a central picturesque bell tower with a steep pyramidal roof topped by a weather vane. It ceased to be used as a school in the late 1970s and serves as a child care center.

It was listed on the National Register of Historic Places in 1981.

See also
List of New York City Designated Landmarks in the Bronx
National Register of Historic Places in Bronx County, New York

References

Eastchester, Bronx
Gothic Revival architecture in New York City
National Register of Historic Places in the Bronx
New York City Designated Landmarks in the Bronx
Public elementary schools in the Bronx
School buildings completed in 1877
School buildings on the National Register of Historic Places in New York City
1877 establishments in New York (state)